The Men's road time trial at the 2014 Commonwealth Games, as part of the cycling programme, was held on 31 July 2014.

Route
The  event started at Glasgow Green at 12:30pm, with each of the riders beginning by heading east to Dennistoun and Haghill. The route continued north-east through Riddrie to the main circuit. The riders turned west and then north towards Barmulloch and Robroyston, before heading east through Auchinloch and on to Chryston and Moodiesburn. The route then headed south to the outskirt of Glenboig and then began to return west, passing through Muirhead, Stepps and Millerston, back towards the finish at Glasgow Green.

Results

References

Men's road time trial
Road cycling at the Commonwealth Games
2014 in men's road cycling